Coleophora textoria is a moth of the family Coleophoridae. It is found in South Africa.

References

Endemic moths of South Africa
textoria
Moths of Africa
Moths described in 1921